Spiridon Gabrovski (1740; Gabrovo – 1824; Rila monastery), also known as Spiridon Rilski, was a Bulgarian clergyman and activist of the Bulgarian National Awakening in the Ottoman Empire. 

Gabrovski was born in Gabrovo in 1740. He worked on Mount Athos, spending many years in the Zograf monastery and the Hilandar monastery. Between 1747 and 1763, due to disagreement between the Bulgarian and Serbian monks there, he settled in the Pantokrator Monastery, with his spiritual father, the hermit Paisius Velichkovsky. In 1763, together with Velichkovsky, they left Mount Athos and went to Moldavia with 64 other monks. In 1779, the group settled in the Neamț Monastery near Iași. 

Spiridon Gabrovski used the library of the monastery to supplement his knowledge and in 1792 he managed to complete a "Short history of the Bulgarian Slavic people". The book contains a wealth of factual material freely used by Father Spiridon. Spiridon approached the so-called Illyrism, which declares the ancient Illyrians, to be early Slavs. Spiridon tried to legitimize the Bulgarians ("Illyrians") through Alexander the Great, presented entirely in a positive light. Alexander defeated the "Illyrian" king Perun, but included the Illyrians in his army and even gave the two sons of Perun the power over Macedonia itself, and he himself established his capital in Babylon.

In 1794, after the death of Paisius Velichkovsky, he left the Neamt monastery and settled finally in the Rila monastery, where he died in 1824.

References 

Bulgarian historians
Bulgarian writers
1740 births
1824 deaths
18th-century Bulgarian people
19th-century Bulgarian people
19th-century Eastern Orthodox bishops
18th-century Eastern Orthodox clergy